Walter Richardson may refer to:

 Walter Richardson (cricketer) (1876–1962), Australian cricketer
 Walter Richardson (politician) (1871–1959), Australian politician
 Walter Richardson (swimmer) (born 1943), American swimmer